Francesco Mancini may refer to:

 Francesco Mancini (footballer, born 1968) (1968–2012), Italian footballer
 Francesco Mancini (footballer, born 1990), Italian footballer
 Francesco Mancini (1679–1758), Italian painter
 Francesco Mancini (1830–1905), Italian painter
 Francesco Longo Mancini (1880–1954), Italian painter

Other
 Francesco Maria Mancini (1606–1672), Italian cardinal
 Francesco Mancini (composer) (1672–1737), Italian baroque composer from Naples